Paulo Autuori de Mello (born 25 August 1956), known as Paulo Autuori, is a Brazilian football executive and manager who is the current manager of Atlético Nacional.

Early life
A football fan since early childhood and a futsal player, Paulo Autuori had to give up his dream of becoming a professional footballer after contracting poliomyelitis in his teens. The disease left him with an atrophied leg and a permanent limp on his walk, which prevented him from playing. However, he did not give up his dream of being part of the footballing world, and decided to learn other aspects of the game, specifically becoming a manager. Autuori's first jobs were working as a physical coach for clubs such as Portuguesa (RJ), and Nacional in Portugal. At Nacional, Paulo Autuori was promoted to manager of the main team, and has enjoyed a successful coaching career ever since.

Autuori graduated in Physical Education at Universidade Castelo Branco; and attended a Sport Admninstration course at PUC-RJ and a Soccer Coach Course at UERJ.

Managing career
Autuori's first major title was winning the 1995 Campeonato Brasileiro with Botafogo.

In 1997, he won the Copa Libertadores with Cruzeiro. In 1998, he joined Flamengo, where he guided them to an 11th-placed finished in the Campeonato Brasileiro, and a group stage exit in the 1998 Copa Mercosur. The following year, he joined Sport Club Internacional, and then Santos, and shortly after that rejoined Cruzeiro for the 1999-2000 season. In 2000, he joined Vitoria Guimaraes.

In 2003, he joined the Peru national team as manager to lead them through 2006 FIFA World Cup qualification and the 2004 Copa América. His first official match was on the first matchday of the World Cup Qualifiers, which finished in a 4–1 win against Paraguay. Peru finished ninth in the table, with 18 points. In April 2005, shortly after the 2–2 draw with Ecuador, he quit Peru, with the reasoning being that he declined to declare in front of a Congress, due to the Peru national team scandals. 

Shortly after quitting Peru, he was hired by São Paulo to replace Émerson Leão, who had just gone to Japan. In that year, he won the 2005 Copa Libertadores and the 2005 FIFA Club World Championship.

Ten days after winning the Club World Championship, on 29 December 2005, he left São Paulo to sign with Japanese club Kashima Antlers, with the financial opportunity being the main reason for the decision. At the end of 2006 he announced his new club as Cruzeiro, this was his third time at the club.

From 2007 to 2009, Autuori managed Qatari club Al-Rayyan. 

In May 2009, Gremio announced Autuori as their new manager with a contract until 2009. However, on 12 November 2009,, Autuori decided to leave Grêmio and return to Al-Rayyan.

On 21 November 2009, Qatar League side Al Rayyan replaced Brazilian coach Marcus Paqueta with his compatriot Paulo Autuori. The latter only left the club six months ago to join Gremio in his homeland, but made a swift return after signing a three-year contract.

Autuori became the coach of the Qatar Olympic team on 27 August 2011. He replaced Frenchman Bernard Simondi. His first assignment was to lead the team during the 2012 London Olympics Qualification stage. Qatar failed to qualify for the Olympics, after finishing third in their group.

On 20 February 2012 The 55-year-old Brazilian became the fourth manager of the Qatar national team in the previous year. He was fired by the QFA on 15 January 2013 after his team failed to qualify for the knockout round of the 2013 Gulf Cup. Shortly after, he was hired by Vasco da Gama. However, he left the club on 10 July 2013, due to poor results and internal conflicts. The following day, Autuori signed with São Paulo, returning to the club after eight years. This time, however, Autuori arrived in São Paulo to solve a crisis, with the club having lost its five last games.

On the following day, Autuori was introduced as the new coach despite the preference of many fans, who wanted Muricy Ramalho's return.  The new coach of São Paulo said that, if the choice were his he would have signed Ramalho who Autuori considered a "winner". Autuori affirmed that he felt "a lot of satisfaction to return to this glorious institution, with big aims."  The former vascaíno coach said that "I have not come to be loved; I have come to be champion."

Even in a middle of a crisis, Autuori has improved the ambient in São Paulo, a bad one in comparison to period that Ney Franco was the coach. Lúcio's removal from staff, according some people of club, was essential for this.

On 9 September 2013, Autuori was fired after a 2–0 loss against Coritiba, a result that kept the club in relegation zone of Brazilian League. In a report from the official site of club, there is a praising about his work. His substitute was Muricy Ramalho, who also replaced him in 2006 in club from Morumbi Stadium.

On 5 June 2018 Autuori was announced as the new Director of football in the Bulgarian champion Ludogorets Razgrad, but on the next day he was presented as the new manager of the team, since Dimitar Dimitrov wanted to leave the club. He stepped down from his position in October 2018, citing personal reasons.

Managerial statistics

Honours
Botafogo
 Campeonato Brasileiro Série A: 1995

Cruzeiro
 Campeonato Mineiro: 1997
 Copa Libertadores: 1997

Alianza Lima
 Primera División Peruana: 2001

Sporting Cristal
 Primera División Peruana: 2002

São Paulo
 Copa Libertadores: 2005
 FIFA Club World Cup: 2005

Al Rayyan
 Emir of Qatar Cup: 2010, 2011

Atlético Paranaense
 Campeonato Paranaense: 2016

Ludogorets Razgrad
Bulgarian Supercup: 2018

References

External links 
 
 
 
 

1956 births
Living people
Brazilian people of Italian descent
Cruzeiro Esporte Clube managers
Brazilian football managers
São Paulo FC managers
C.S. Marítimo managers
Brazilian expatriate football managers
Expatriate football managers in Peru
Expatriate football managers in Japan
Expatriate football managers in Portugal
Expatriate football managers in Qatar
Expatriate football managers in Bulgaria
Expatriate football managers in Colombia
Campeonato Brasileiro Série A managers
Primeira Liga managers
Qatar Stars League managers
J1 League managers
J2 League managers
Categoría Primera A managers
America Football Club (RJ) managers
Vitória S.C. managers
Kashima Antlers managers
Club Alianza Lima managers
Sporting Cristal managers
CR Flamengo managers
Peru national football team managers
2004 Copa América managers
Al-Rayyan SC managers
Santos FC managers
Botafogo de Futebol e Regatas managers
CR Vasco da Gama managers
People with polio
Pontifical Catholic University of Rio de Janeiro alumni
Bonsucesso Futebol Clube managers
Associação Atlética Portuguesa (RJ) managers
Esporte Clube São Bento managers
Marília Atlético Clube managers
Clube Atlético Mineiro managers
Cerezo Osaka managers
Club Athletico Paranaense managers
Qatar national football team managers
PFC Ludogorets Razgrad managers
Atlético Nacional managers
Sportspeople from Rio de Janeiro (city)
Santos FC non-playing staff
Brazilian expatriate sportspeople in Peru
Brazilian expatriate sportspeople in Japan
Brazilian expatriate sportspeople in Portugal
Brazilian expatriate sportspeople in Qatar
Brazilian expatriate sportspeople in Bulgaria
Brazilian expatriate sportspeople in Colombia